Mithran R. Jawahar (born 8 June 1979) is an Indian film director who works predominantly in Tamil cinema.

Career
Jawahar, an erstwhile assistant of Selvaraghavan, began working on his first film starring Dhanush in December 2004. A remake of the Telugu film Arya (2004), the film was later put on hold and restarted at a later date. As a result, his debut venture was the 2008 film Yaaradi Nee Mohini, starring Dhanush and Nayantara, which was a runaway hit. The film was a remake of the Telugu film Aadavari Matalaku Arthale Verule, directed by Selvaraghavan.

His next two films Kutty (2010) and Uthamaputhiran (2010), both again remakes and again featuring Dhanush in the lead role, also became successful.

In 2014, Jawahar began work on Saamiyattam, a remake of the Telugu film Swamy Ra Ra, produced and featuring Srikanth in the lead role, but it was later shelved.

He then moved on to direct a remake of the Malayalam film Thattathin Marayathu, titled Meendum Oru Kadhal Kadhai, in 2016.

In 2021, Jawahar made his first original script with the social drama Mathil, which starred director-actor K. S. Ravikumar in the lead role which was made for digital platform Zee5.

In 2022, he directed the film Thiruchitrambalam, which was his fourth collaboration with Dhanush which also went do well at box-office.

Filmography
Films

References

Indian film directors
Tamil film directors
Living people
Film directors from Tamil Nadu
Place of birth missing (living people)
1971 births
Artists from Tiruchirappalli